Clash of the Titans: Original Motion Picture Soundtrack is the soundtrack to the film of the same name. This music was composed by Ramin Djawadi and released on March 30, 2010. Matthew Bellamy was originally hired to write the music, but abandoned the project midway through after his band Muse started a tour. Craig Armstrong was then attached to the project before leaving. Djawadi was brought in two weeks before the release of the film, so the soundtrack includes additional music by Geoff Zanelli, Bobby Tahouri and Dominic Lewis.

Track listing

References 

2010 soundtrack albums
2010s film soundtrack albums
Ramin Djawadi soundtracks
Fantasy film soundtracks
WaterTower Music soundtracks
Action film soundtracks
Clash of the Titans (film series)